The Marklands is a sourcebook for the Dungeons & Dragons fantasy role-playing game that describes the realms of Furyondy, Highfolk, Nyrond in the game's World of Greyhawk campaign setting. The sourcebook bears the code WGR4 and was published by TSR in 1993 for the second edition Advanced Dungeons & Dragons rules.

Contents
The Marklands provides detailed information regarding Furyondy, Highfolk, and Nyrond in the aftermath of the Greyhawk Wars.

Publication history
The sourcebook was written by Carl Sargent with cover art by Jeff Easley and interior art by Eric Hotz.  It was designed to supplement Sargent's From the Ashes boxed set for Greyhawk.

Reception

References

External links
The Marklands at the TSR Archive

Greyhawk books
Role-playing game supplements introduced in 1993